The flyssa is a traditional edged weapon of Algeria produced and used during the 19th century and earlier. It originates from the Kabyle Iflissen Lebhar tribal confederacy.

Characteristics 
Whatever their size, flyssas are characterized by narrow, straight-backed, single-edged blades, which come to an acute point. The blades of sword-sized flyssas often widen gradually around the point of percussion, which enhances their cutting ability. The blades are often decorated with chiselled patterns, which are sometimes inlaid.

The hilt has no guard and the junction between blade and hilt is made by a metal bolster. The distal part of the hilt is almost always of wood covered with brass, usually decorated with repoussé and chasing, and has a characteristic downturned projection forming the snout of a stylised animal head at the 'pommel' end (though the pommel and grip are made in a single piece - the identity of the animal is unknown, with dog, camel and chimaera all being suggested).

Name 
The blade's name (Flyssa) was given by the French based on the name of the tribe which it originated from (Iflissen). In pre-colonial times, the sword was called "Ajenwi" a word derived from the name of the city of Genoa from which the blades which were used in its manufacture were imported from or the term "Asekkin" from Arabic ("Sekkine").

References

External links 
 Photograph of a traditional flyssa 

African swords